Eragrostis tracyi is a species of flowering plant in the family Poaceae, native to Florida in the United States. It was first described by Albert Hitchcock in 1934. It has also been treated as a variety of Eragrostis pectinacea under the name E. pectinacea var. tracyi.

References

tracyi
Flora of Florida
Plants described in 1934